Thallus is an undifferentiated vegetative tissue of some non-mobile organisms.

Thallus may also refer to:

 Thallus (historian), the chronologer/historian
 Thallus (poet), the Roman era Greek epigrammatist

See also
 Thallium, a toxic element named after the scientific term due to the green color it produces in flame
 Thali dialect, also known as Thalli, a dialect of Pakistan